Sunshine Blind was an American goth/trip hop/darkwave band started in 1991 by CWHK and Caroline Blind. They released four albums before breaking up in 2003.

History
Sunshine Blind was formed in New York/New Jersey area in 1991 by core members CWHK and Caroline Blind. In 1994 they launched a demo cassette, Sunshine Blind, and one year later they launched their first professional album, Love the Sky to Death, with Scream Records. In 1997 they launched a new album, Liquid, with Energy Rekords and started to work in new songs.

In 1997 after many tours in the United States, Energy Records disappeared and Sunshine Blind couldn't find a new discography. Caroline Blind recalled about those years: "Since we had a lot of bills and debts to pay, we had to live on day jobs for a while." Eventually they reunited to do a UK tour and started to work on a fourth CD. In 2003 they launched their new album, I Carry You, but then dissolved some months later.

Legacy
Next project by most of the remaining members was Fear Makes Perfect, which never found its sound before it dissolved in October 2004.  Caroline Blind of both bands, works independently on music at the moment.

Discography
Sunshine Blind (1994)
Love the Sky to Death (1995)
 Liquid (1997)
 I Carry You (2003)

Personnel
Caroline Blind - Vocals, Guitar
CWHK - Guitar
Mark 27 - Bass
Gregg Ziemba - Drums

Other members:
Geoff Bruce - Drums
Cousin Al - Bass
J.T. Murphy - Bass

References

External links
Sunshine Blind, official website. *DEACTIVATED
Sunshine Blind in Myspace.

American electronic music groups
American dark wave musical groups
Trip hop groups
Underground, Inc. artists